The Nissan Diesel Space Runner RP (kana:日産ディーゼル・スペースランナーRP) was an integrally-constructed heavy-duty single-decker bus produced by the Japanese manufacturer Nissan Diesel between 1986 until 2007. The range was primarily available as a public bus and as a complete bus.

Models 
The Nissan Diesel Space Runner RP is available as either in step-entrance or low-entry variants. Its step-entrance compartment is known as Two Step whereas its low-entry compartment is known as One Step. A common design is that it has a double-curvature windscreen with a rounded roof dome similar to its successor, the Nissan Diesel Space Runner RA with a separately mounted destination indicator.

P-RP80 (1986)
U-RP210 (1991)
KC-RP211/250 (1995)
KL-RP252 (2000)
PK-RP360 (2006)

External links 

Buses of Japan
Low-entry buses
Step-entrance buses
Single-deck buses
UD trucks
Space Runner RP
Full-size buses
Vehicles introduced in 1986